Chris Kachel (born 19 June 1955) is a former professional tennis player from Australia.  

Kachel enjoyed most of his tennis success while playing doubles.  During his career he won 3 doubles titles. More recently, Kachel launched a modelling career by appearing on the Australian TV Show Postcards.

Career finals

Doubles: 3 titles, 8 runner-ups

External links
 
 

Australian male tennis players
People from Tamworth, New South Wales
Tennis people from New South Wales
Australian Institute of Sport coaches
1955 births
Living people